Carnac is a commune beside the Gulf of Morbihan on the south coast of Brittany in the Morbihan department in north-western France.

Its inhabitants are called Carnacois in French. Carnac is renowned for the Carnac stones – one of the most extensive Neolithic menhir collections in the world – as well as its beaches, which are popular with tourists.

Located on a narrow peninsula halfway between the medieval town Vannes and the seaside resort Quiberon, Carnac is split into two centres: Carnac-Ville and Carnac-Plage (the beachfront). In total there are five beaches, including la Grande Plage, and further to the east, Plage Men Dû and Beaumer.

Map

Standing stones

Carnac is famous as the site of more than 10,000 Neolithic standing stones, also known as menhirs. The stones were hewn from local rock and erected by the pre-Celtic people of Brittany. Local tradition claims that the reason they stand in such perfectly straight lines is that they are a Roman legion turned to stone by Pope Cornelius.

The Carnac stones were erected during the Neolithic period which lasted from around 4500 BC until 2000 BC. The precise date of the stones is difficult to ascertain as little dateable material has been found beneath them, but the site's main phase of activity is commonly attributed to c. 3300 BC. One interpretation of the site is that successive generations visited the site to erect a stone in honour of their ancestors. A recent suggestion, proposed by Santiago Sevilla, posits that the megaliths were set as protecting shields for an army of defenders of Carnac as a pre-erected burg against attacking enemies.

History
In 1864, La Trinité-sur-Mer and its port were separated from the commune to create their own commune and parish. The fishermen found the church in Saint-Cornély to be too far from the port, and had one built in a more convenient location. La Trinité-sur-Mer thus became both a parish and a separate commune. 

In 1903, a seaside resort was created on the old salt flats, developing extensively through the 1950s to create the split Carnac of today: Carnac-ville and Carnac-plage. In 1974, a renowned hydrotherapy  centre was sponsored by champion cyclist Louison Bobet, retiring after having won the Tour de France three times from 1953 to 1955.

In 1958, the place became a new tourism site to the astonishing direct line of stones and some people speculated that the stones were old graves.

Tourism

Since the end of World War II, Carnac has become a popular site for tourists seeking a break from the traditional destinations on the Côte d'Azur.  During the months of July and August, the number of people in the town increases significantly from the influx of tourists and summer residents.  The beaches of Brittany are rarely able to offer warm waters on par with those of their southern cousins; however, local factors have ensured that Carnac continues to attract large numbers of visitors.  Wind and waves in the region attract day and cruise sailors.  The Standing Stones and other monuments in the vicinity provide some cultural attraction and Carnac-Plage's variety of bars and clubs ensures that a younger set can entertain themselves at night.

There is a number of camping grounds in the woods around Carnac, some clustered around various lakes such as the Étang du moulin du lac which is immediately to the west of the river Crac'h. There are also other campsites near Carnac, including Camping le Moulin de Kermaux, Des Menhirs and La Grande Metairie.

Carnac is home to "École de Voile de Carnac" which provides sailing and windsurfing lessons and rentals to sailors of all levels of experience.  The geography of the Bay of Quiberon provides ideal conditions for sailing.  The Peninsula of Quiberon provides protection from Atlantic waves and turbulence while allowing the Gulf Winds to enter the bay.

For windsurfers, the Saint-Colomban beach is located in Carnac-Plage.  The beach is very popular with windsurfers, as its position allows for the best exploitation of strong winds from the West.  Other beaches in the area provide equal access to the winds of the bay but windsurfers may find themselves frustrated in the areas of dead air close to their shores.

Other beaches in Carnac include Bihan Plage, Légenèse Plage, Grande Plage, Beaumer Plage and Men-Du Plage.

A local myth holds that a unicorn lives in the waters off the city and in a cave near St. Malo.

71.4 % of the properties are holiday homes, one of the highest percentage in Morbihan.

Neighboring communes
Carnac is connected to La Trinité-sur-Mer to the east by road and by a shared pedestrian/bike path along the beach. The other neighbouring communes are Crac'h, Erdeven, Ploemel and Plouharnel.

Demographics
Inhabitants of Carnac are called Carnacois.

Breton language
In 2008, the municipality launched a linguistic plan and signed an agreement to encourage and facilitate the translation of municipal documents and news materials into the Breton language.

In 2009, 11.03% of children attended bilingual schools in primary education.

See also
Standing stones
Carnac stones
Communes of the Morbihan department
List of archaeoastronomical sites sorted by country
List of megalithic sites

References

Carnac: Guide pratique 2006 (provided by Carnac tourist office)

Notes

External links

Carnac official website 
 Carnac at france-for-visitors.com (includes map)

Archaeological sites in France
Communes of Morbihan
Populated coastal places in Brittany
Seaside resorts in France